Orange County is a county located in the U.S. state of Vermont. As of the 2020 census, the population was 29,277. Its shire town (county seat) is the town of Chelsea. Orange County was organized on February 2, 1781, as an original county within the state.

Geography

Adjacent counties
 Caledonia County – northeast
 Grafton County, New Hampshire – east
 Windsor County – southwest
 Addison County – west
 Washington County – northwest

Demographics

2000 census
As of the census of 2000, the county had 28,226 people, 10,936 households, and 7,611 families. The population density was 41 people per square mile (16/km2). There were 13,386 housing units at an average density of 19 per square mile (8/km2).

The county's racial makeup was 98.02% White, 0.24% Black or African American, 0.27% Native American, 0.35% Asian, 0.04% Pacific Islander, 0.13% from other races, and 0.95% from two or more races. 0.58% of the population were Hispanic or Latino of any race. 24.3% were of English, 12.8% French, 11.5% American, 10.8% Irish, 6.0% German and 5.5% French Canadian ancestry. 97.4% spoke English and 1.5% French as their first language.

There were 10,936 households, of which 33.40% had children under the age of 18 living with them, 56.10% were married couples living together, 8.90% had a female householder with no husband present, and 30.40% were non-families. 23.40% of all households were made up of individuals, and 9.20% had someone living alone who was 65 years of age or older. The average household size was 2.52 and the average family size was 2.97.

25.60% of the county's population was under age 18, 7.80% was from age 18 to 24, 28.20% was from age 25 to 44, 25.60% was from age 45 to 64, and 12.80% was age 65 or older.

The median age was 39 years. For every 100 females, there were 99.20 males. For every 100 females age 18 and over, there were 96.60 males.

The county's median household income was $39,855, and the median family income was $45,771. Males had a median income of $30,679 versus $24,144 for females. The county's per capita income was $18,784. About 6.10% of families and 9.10% of the population were below the poverty line, including 11.40% of those under age 18 and 8.80% of those age 65 or over.

2010 census
As of the 2010 United States Census, the county had 28,936 people, 11,887 households, and 7,865 families.

The county's racial makeup was 97.0% white, 0.5% Asian, 0.4% black or African American, 0.3% American Indian, 0.3% from other races, and 1.5% from two or more races. Those of Hispanic or Latino origin made up 1.0% of the population. The largest ancestry groups were English (22.4%), Irish (16.5%); French (14.7%), German (10.4%), "American" (7.3%), French Canadian (7.1%), Italian (6.5%); Scottish (6.5%).

Of the 11,887 households, 28.3% had children under age 18 living with them, 51.9% were married couples living together, 9.3% had a female householder with no husband present, 33.8% were non-families, and 25.9% of all households were made up of individuals. The average household size was 2.37 and the average family size was 2.83. The median age was 43.8 years.

The county's median household income was $52,079 and the median family income was $61,221. Males had a median income of $41,281 versus $35,938 for females. The county's per capita income was $25,951. About 6.2% of families and 10.0% of the population were below the poverty line, including 13.2% of those under age 18 and 7.2% of those age 65 or over.

Government
As in all Vermont counties, there is a small executive function that is mostly consolidated at the state level. Remaining county government is judicial. There are no "county taxes."

Legislators
The Orange Senate district includes most of Orange County. It is represented in the Vermont Senate by Mark A. MacDonald (D).
The Washington Senate district includes the Towns of Braintree and Orange, both in Orange County, as well as all of Washington County and the Town of Stowe Lamoille County. It is represented in the Vermont Senate by Ann Cummings (D), Andrew Perchlik (D), and Anne Watson (D).
The Windsor Senate district includes the Town of Thetford, in Orange County, as well as most of Windsor County. It is represented in the Vermont Senate by Alison Clarkson (D), Dick McCormack (D), and Rebecca White (D).
The Caledonia Senate district includes the Town of Newbury, in Orange County, as well as most of Caledonia County. It is represented in the Vermont Senate by Jane Kitchel (D).

Politics
In 1828, Orange County was won by National Republican Party candidate John Quincy Adams.

In 1832, the county was won by Anti-Masonic Party candidate William Wirt.

From William Henry Harrison in 1836 to Winfield Scott in 1852, the county would vote the Whig Party candidates.

From John C. Frémont in 1856 to Richard Nixon in 1960 (barring 1912, where the county was won by Progressive Party candidate and former president Theodore Roosevelt), the Republican Party would have a 104-year winning streak in the county.

In 1964, the county was won by Democratic Party incumbent President Lyndon B. Johnson, who became not only the first Democratic presidential candidate to win Orange County, but the first to win the state of Vermont entirely.

Following the Democrats victory in 1964, the county went back to voting for Republican candidates for another 20 year winning streak starting with Richard Nixon in 1968 and ending with George H. W. Bush in 1988.

The county would be won by Bill Clinton in both the 1992 and 1996 presidential elections.

George W. Bush would win Orange County in 2000 and would be the last time a Republican presidential candidate would carry the county.

John Kerry won the county in 2004 and has been won by Democratic candidates ever since.

|}

Education

The county is served by four school districts (supervisory unions):
 Orange East Supervisory Union (Superintendent: Wendy Baker)
 Orange North Supervisory Union
 Orange Southwest Supervisory Union
 Orange Windsor Supervisory Union

Orange County is also home to the Vermont Technical College, in the town of Randolph.

Orange North Supervisory Union
The union's superintendent is Douglas Shiok, and it includes:
 Orange Center School (Principal: Richard P. Jacobs)
 Washington Village School (Principal: Charles R. Witters, Jr.)
 Williamstown Elementary School (Principal: Elaine K. Watson)
 Williamstown Middle High School (Principal: Heidi Moccia [middle]; Juanita Burch-Clay [high]).

Communities

Towns

 Bradford
 Braintree
 Brookfield
 Chelsea (shire town)
 Corinth
 Fairlee
 Newbury
 Orange
 Randolph
 Strafford
 Thetford
 Topsham
 Tunbridge
 Vershire
 Washington
 West Fairlee
 Williamstown

Villages
 Newbury
 West Newbury
 Wells River
 Union Village, Vermont

Census-designated places
 Bradford
 Chelsea
 Fairlee
 Randolph
 Williamstown

Unincorporated community
 Post Mills

See also
 National Register of Historic Places listings in Orange County, Vermont
 Alexander Kennedy Miller

References

External links
 National Register of Historic Places: Orange County, Vermont
 The Political Graveyard: Orange County, Vermont

 
1781 establishments in Vermont
Populated places established in 1781
Lebanon micropolitan area